Huang Boyun is the former President of Central South University, the academician of Chinese Academy of Engineering (CAE) and a member of Chinese Communist Party (CCP) and a representative of the 16th and 17th National Congress of the Chinese Communist Party.

References

1945 births
Living people
Engineers from Hunan
People from Yiyang
Members of the Chinese Academy of Engineering